Maksim Viktorovich Tishchenko (born 30 August 1974) is a Russian professional football coach and a former player. He also holds Ukrainian citizenship.

Club career
He made his debut in the Russian Premier League in 1996 for FC Rotor Volgograd.

Honours
 Russian Premier League runner-up: 1997.
 Russian Premier League bronze: 1996.
 Russian Second Division, Zone Center best defender: 2009.

European competition history
All with FC Rotor Volgograd.

 UEFA Intertoto Cup 1996: 8 games.
 UEFA Cup 1997–98: 2 games.
 UEFA Cup 1998–99: 2 games.

References

External links
 

1974 births
Footballers from Zaporizhzhia
Living people
Russian footballers
Ukrainian footballers
Association football midfielders
FC Metalurh Zaporizhzhia players
FC Viktor Zaporizhzhia players
FC Dynamo Stavropol players
FC Rotor Volgograd players
FC Ural Yekaterinburg players
FC Volgar Astrakhan players
Russian Premier League players
Russian football managers
Ukrainian football managers
FC Arsenal Tula players
FC Zvezda Irkutsk players
Expatriate football managers in Lithuania
FK Banga Gargždai managers
FC Yenisey Krasnoyarsk players
FC Avangard Kursk players
FC Spartak Kostroma players
Russian expatriate football managers
Ukrainian expatriate football managers